Al-Dana, Maarrat al-Nu'man  is a Syrian village located in Maarrat al-Nu'man Nahiyah in Maarrat al-Nu'man District, Idlib.  According to the Syria Central Bureau of Statistics (CBS), Al-Dana, Maarrat al-Nu'man had a population of 2607 in the 2004 census.

References 

Populated places in Maarat al-Numan District